Fernando González was the defending champion but lost in the first round to Michal Tabara.

Andy Roddick won in the final 7–5, 6–3 against Hyung-Taik Lee.

Seeds
A champion seed is indicated in bold text while text in italics indicates the round in which that seed was eliminated.

  Jan-Michael Gambill (first round)
  Andrew Ilie (quarterfinals)
  Jérôme Golmard (semifinals)
  Michal Tabara (semifinals)
  Magnus Gustafsson (second round)
  Olivier Rochus (quarterfinals)
  Xavier Malisse (second round)
  Hyung-Taik Lee (final)

Draw

External links
 2001 U.S. Men's Clay Court Championships Draw

2001 Singles
Singles